Mbambanakira Airport is an airport on Mbambanakira in the Solomon Islands .

Airlines and destinations

External links
Solomon Airlines Routes

Airports in the Solomon Islands